Archery event at the 2015 Parapan American Games was played from 9–10 August 2015 at the Varsity Stadium in Toronto.

Medal summary

Medal table

Medal events

References

External links
 Archery Results

 
Events at the 2015 Parapan American Games
International archery competitions hosted by Canada
2015 in archery